Broadview can refer to:

Places

Australia
Broadview, South Australia

Canada
Broadview (electoral district), in Ontario
Broadview (TTC), a Toronto subway station
Broadview Avenue, a street in Toronto
Broadview, Saskatchewan

United States
Broadview, Illinois
Broadview, Indiana
Broadview, Montana
Broadview, Cibola County, New Mexico
Broadview, Curry County, New Mexico
Broadview, Seattle, Washington
Broadview Creek in Seattle
Broadview Heights, Ohio
Broadview Park, Florida
Broadview-Pompano Park, Florida

Other uses
Broadview (magazine), formerly the United Church Observer
Broadview Press, Canadian academic publisher
Broadview Security, formerly Brink's Home Security